People We Meet on Vacation is a romance novel by Emily Henry, published May 11, 2021 by Berkley Books. The book is a New York Times best seller.

Overview 
People We Meet on Vacation follows Poppy and Alex, two best friends who are opposites in every way. She is a wild child with insatiable wanderlust while he is laidback and would rather stay home with a book. Every summer they come together for a week long vacation. Until one trip where everything is ruined and they stop speaking for two years. Now, in order to find happiness Poppy convinces Alex to take one last vacation, in order to fix everything between them.

Reception 
People We Meet on Vacation is a New York Times and IndieBound best seller.

The book received starred reviews from Library Journal and Kirkus, as well as positive reviews from The Washington Post, Associated Press, and Publishers Weekly.

In a starred review, Kirkus describes the novel as a “warm and winning ‘When Harry Met Sally…’ update that hits all the perfect notes." Library Journal explains in its starred review that Henry’s book is story that will appeal to those who “are drawn to stories with emotion, poetic language, and a strong sense of place” and compares it to Kate Clayborn’s Love Lettering. Alicia Rancilio of Associated Press praises Henry’s writing, even highlighting that she is “especially skilled at is writing dialogue.” From The Washington Post, Angela Hurt applauds Henry, saying she "masterfully depicts early-30s uncertainty and angst, adding an interesting personal-growth dimension to the story." Hurt, however, also claims that it still fails to live up to Henry’s previous novel stating, "'People' lacks the pizazz — the special spark — that helped “Beach Read” shine." Publishers Weekly concurred, saying that “Henry’s latest rom-com lacks the spark of 2020’s Beach Read, but still offers plenty of lighthearted summertime fun.”

References 

2021 American novels
Berkley Books books
American romance novels
Contemporary romance novels